Germany participated in the Eurovision Song Contest 2007 with the song "Frauen regier'n die Welt" written by Matthias Haß and Frank Ramond. The song was performed by Roger Cicero. The German entry for the 2007 contest in Helsinki, Finland, was selected through the national final Wer singt für Deutschland?, organised by the German broadcaster ARD in collaboration with Norddeutscher Rundfunk (NDR). The national final took place on 8 March 2007 and featured three competing acts with the winner being selected through public voting. "Frauen regier'n die Welt" performed by Roger Cicero was selected as the German entry for Helsinki after gaining 70% of the vote.

As a member of the "Big Four", Germany automatically qualified to compete in the final of the Eurovision Song Contest. Performing in position 16, Germany placed nineteenth out of the 24 participating countries with 49 points.

Background 

Germany has won the contest on one occasion: in 1982 with the song "Ein bißchen Frieden" performed by Nicole. Germany, to this point, has been noted for having competed in the contest more than any other country; they have competed in every contest since the first edition in 1956 except for the 1996 contest when the nation was eliminated in a pre-contest elimination round. In 2006, the German entry "No No Never" performed by Texas Lightning placed fourteenth out of twenty-four competing songs scoring 36 points.

The German national broadcaster, ARD, broadcasts the event within Germany and delegates the selection of the nation's entry to the regional broadcaster Norddeutscher Rundfunk (NDR). NDR confirmed that Germany would participate in the 2007 Eurovision Song Contest on 7 December 2006. Since 1996, NDR had set up national finals with several artists to choose both the song and performer to compete at Eurovision for Germany. The broadcaster also announced that they would organise a multi-artist national final to select the German entry.

Before Eurovision

Wer singt für Deutschland? 
Wer singt für Deutschland? (English: Who sings for Germany?) was the competition that selected Germany's entry for the Eurovision Song Contest 2007. The competition took place on 8 March 2007 at the Schauspielhaus in Hamburg, hosted by Thomas Hermanns. Three acts competed during the show with the winner being selected through a public televote. The show was broadcast on Das Erste as well as online via the broadcaster's Eurovision Song Contest website eurovision.de. The national final was watched by 4.6 million viewers in Germany.

Competing entries 
Three acts were selected by an expert panel consisting of representatives of the entertainment department for NDR. Two of the participating acts were announced on 20 December 2006 and the third act was announced on 23 January 2007.

Final 
The televised final took place on 8 March 2007. The winner, "Frauen regier'n die Welt" performed by Roger Cicero, was selected solely through public voting, including options for landline and SMS voting. In addition to the performances of the competing entries, each participating act performed a cover version of a former Eurovision song of their choice. Roger Cicero performed "Zwei kleine Italiener" by Conny Froboess, Monrose performed "Wunder gibt es immer wieder" by Katja Ebstein and Heinz Rudolf Kunze performed "Merci, Chérie" by Udo Jürgens. Former Eurovision entrants Bucks Fizz, Gitte Hænning, Johnny Logan, Katrina Leskanich, Siw Malmkvist, Texas Lightning and Wenche Myhre also performed their respective entries. Approximately 900,000 votes were cast in the final.

The lyrics of the winning song were criticised by Germany's feminist magazine EMMA. They voted Roger Cicero "Pasha of the Month" (a title for men who display chauvinist attitudes) because of the song's lyrics. They were of the opinion that the line  (translation: "and soon your wallet and heart open and then you buy a ring and mink coat") was antiquated.

At Eurovision 
According to Eurovision rules, all nations with the exceptions of the host country and the "Big Four" (France, Germany, Spain and the United Kingdom) are required to qualify from the semi-final in order to compete for the final; the top ten countries from the semi-final progress to the final. As a member of the "Big 4", Germany automatically qualified to compete in the final on 12 May 2007. In addition to their participation in the final, Germany is also required to broadcast and vote in the semi-final. The running order for the final in addition to the semi-final was decided through an allocation draw, and Germany was subsequently drawn to perform in position sixteen, following Russia and preceding Serbia. At the conclusion of the final, Germany placed nineteenth in the final, scoring 49 points.

In Germany, the two shows were broadcast on Das Erste which featured commentary by Peter Urban, and the final was broadcast on hr3 which featured commentary by Tim Frühling and on NDR 2 which featured commentary by Thomas Mohr. The German spokesperson, who announced the top 12-point score awarded by the German televote during the final, was Thomas Hermanns.

After Cicero's disappointing finish at the Eurovision, German newspaper Der Spiegel commented on the song's genre: "Swing is actually a pop music antiquity that you have to be historically receptive to." The CD single of "Frauen regier'n die Welt" charted in Germany, peaking at number 7 in the official German charts; it also charted in other German-language markets, peaking at number 51 in Austria's Ö3 Top 40 and number 64 in Switzerland's Hitparade.

Voting 
Below is a breakdown of points awarded to Germany and awarded by Germany in the semi-final and grand final of the contest, and the breakdown of the voting conducted during the two shows. Germany awarded its 12 points both in the semi-final and the grand final of the contest to Turkey.

Points awarded to Germany

Points awarded by Germany

References

2007
Countries in the Eurovision Song Contest 2007
Eurovision
Eurovision